Issa Ba (born 7 October 1981) is a Senegalese former professional footballer who played as a midfielder.

Career
Ba was born in Dakar, Senegal. He played before for AJ Auxerre and Wisła Kraków.

Honours
Dinamo București
 Romanian Supercup: 2012

References

External links
 
 

Living people
1981 births
Footballers from Dakar
Association football midfielders
Senegalese footballers
Ligue 1 players
Ekstraklasa players
Liga I players
Stade Lavallois players
LB Châteauroux players
AJ Auxerre players
Wisła Kraków players
ASA 2013 Târgu Mureș players
CS Gaz Metan Mediaș players
FC Dinamo București players
ASC Jaraaf players
Al-Shabab SC (Kuwait) players
Senegalese expatriate sportspeople in France
Senegalese expatriate sportspeople in Poland
Senegalese expatriate sportspeople in Romania
Expatriate footballers in France
Expatriate footballers in Poland
Expatriate footballers in Romania
Kuwait Premier League players
Expatriate footballers in Kuwait
Senegalese expatriate sportspeople in Kuwait